Hicks Pond is a lake in the U.S. state of New York.

An old variant name was "Hacks Pond".

References

Lakes of Rensselaer County, New York
Lakes of New York (state)